was a Japanese politician who was Prime Minister of Japan from 1976 to 1978. His eldest son Yasuo Fukuda later became Prime Minister as well.

Early life and education
Fukuda was born in Kaneko village, Gunma district, Gunma prefecture (present day Takasaki City) on 14 January 1905. He hailed from a former samurai family and his father was mayor of Gunma. He held a law degree from University of Tokyo.

Career

Early government activities 
Before and during World War II, Fukuda served as a bureaucrat in the Finance Ministry and as Chief Cabinet Secretary. After the war, he became director of Japan's banking bureau from 1946 to 1947 and of budget bureau from 1947 to 1950.

In 1952, Fukuda was elected to the House of Representatives representing the third district of Gunma. Fukuda's political mentor was Nobusuke Kishi, who was detained as a Class A war criminal after World War II and later became prime minister. Under Kishi's patronage, Fukuda was elected party secretary in 1957 and served as Minister of Agriculture, Forestry, and Fisheries (1959–60).

After Kishi was forced to resign as prime minister following his disastrous response to the massive 1960 Anpo protests against the U.S.-Japan Security treaty, Fukuda became the ringleader of an effort by Kishi's faction in the Diet to hinder the agenda Kishi's successor as prime minister, Hayato Ikeda. To this end, Fukuda helped found a "Party Spirit Renovation League" (Tōfū Sasshin Renmei) that became a forum for Diet members to air anti-Ikeda greivances. When Ikeda successfully ran for reelection as Liberal Democratic Party (LDP) president in 1962, the 70 or so members of the Party Spirit Renovation League cast blank ballots in protest.

Although Fukuda remained locked out of the cabinet during the Ikeda years, his star began to rise again after Ikeda was succeeded by Kishi's younger brother Eisaku Satō. Under Satō, Fukuda rose to the prestigious posts of Minister of Finance (1965-66, 1968–71) and Minister of Foreign Affairs (1971–72). After Satō's third and final term as prime minister came to an end in 1972, Fukuda ran as a candidate to replace him but lost out to insurgent candidate Kakuei Tanaka. Under Tanaka, Fukuda once again served as Minister of Finance (1973-74), and even when the Tanaka cabinet fell due to a corruption scandal, Fukuda was seen as "clean" and served a stint as Director of the Economic Planning Agency under the ensuing cabinet of Takeo Miki (1974–76).

Prime Ministership 
After the LDP's poor showing in the 1976 election, Miki stepped down as prime minister and Fukuda was elected to replace him. Fukuda remained in office until 1978, but was forced to rely on the support of minor parties to maintain a parliamentary majority. Although he was regarded as a conservative and a hawk on foreign policy, Fukuda drew international criticism when he caved in to the demands of a group of terrorists who hijacked Japan Airlines Flight 472, saying "Jinmei wa chikyū yori omoi (The value of a human life outweighs the Earth)."

In matters of Sino-Japanese relations, Fukuda began as one of the LDP's conservative pro-Taiwan voices. However, by the time he had become Prime Minister, he was forced to accommodate increasing calls within both the LDP as well as Japanese big business to further pursue peace treaty negotiations with the People's Republic of China in order to bring about increased access to trade in the long run. Fukuda stalled on this for a number of reasons. For one, there was still continued resistance among some in the LDP who were pro-Taiwan. Moreover, relations with the Soviet Union were only recently recovering from disputes over fisheries, and as China and the Soviet Union had strained relations, Fukuda was careful not to favour one too much over the other. The primary dispute, however, was China's insistence on the treaty to contain an "anti-hegemony clause" which Japan viewed as being directed towards the Soviet Union, and Fukuda did not wish Japan to become involved in the Sino-Soviet schism. After treaty discussions spent much time in limbo, the Chinese side eventually expressed flexibility on the anti-hegemony issue, and Fukuda gave the greenlight to pursue them. Before long, however, pro-Taiwan voices in the LDP placed intense pressure on the Fukuda, and further indecision led to Fukuda's approval ratings to dip down to 20%. Eventually, after further discussion, Fukuda finally consented to a modified version of the treaty which later became the Treaty of Peace and Friendship between Japan and China.

On 18 August 1977, Fukuda delivered an address at the ASEAN summit in Manila, which had been popularly dubbed as the "Fukuda Doctrine." In this speech, Fukuda was mainly concerned with three goals: overcoming the psychological barriers between Southeast Asia and Japan which came about due to World War II by reaffirming Japan's commitment to pacifism, increasing mutual "heart-to-heart" confidence between Japan and ASEAN countries, and the willingness of Japan to be an "equal partner" with ASEAN countries (rather than the economic giant it was feared as). In order to bolster these promises, Fukuda clarified Japanese willingness to provide for loans and development assistance, but under the condition that ASEAN does not require Japan to commit to joining an exclusivist trading block.

In an effort to end the LDP's faction system, Fukuda introduced primary elections within the party. In the first primary towards the end of 1978, he was beaten by Masayoshi Ōhira for the presidency of the LDP, and forced to resign as Prime Minister. Fukuda was later instrumental in the formation of the Inter Action Council. He retired from politics in 1990.

Personal life

Fukuda was married and had five children: three sons and two daughters. His eldest son, Yasuo Fukuda, after the sudden resignation of Shinzō Abe, became Prime Minister in September 2007, and remained in that office for one year, making him the first son of a Japanese prime minister to become a prime minister himself. In addition, Prime Minister Junichiro Koizumi began his political career as a secretary to Fukuda, and the two were very close in their political and personal lives from the 1970s onward (Fukuda was the best man at Koizumi's wedding).

In his 1977 speech delivered to ASEAN, Fukuda identified controversial Filipino dictator Ferdinand Marcos as a close friend of his.

Death
Fukuda died of chronic emphysema in the hospital of Tokyo Women's Medical College on 5 July 1995 at the age of 90.

Honours
Grand Cordon of the Order of the Chrysanthemum (5 July 1995; posthumous)
Golden Pheasant Award of the Scout Association of Japan (1979)

References 

|-

|-

|-

|-

|-

|-

|-

|-

|-

|-

|-

|-

|-

1905 births
1995 deaths
20th-century prime ministers of Japan
Economic planning ministers of Japan
Liberal Democratic Party (Japan) politicians
Members of the House of Representatives (Japan)
Deputy Prime Ministers of Japan
Ministers of Finance of Japan
People from Takasaki, Gunma
Prime Ministers of Japan
University of Tokyo alumni
20th-century Japanese politicians
Foreign ministers of Japan
Politicians from Gunma Prefecture
Parents of prime ministers of Japan
Member of the Mont Pelerin Society